Mark Cross may refer to:

Mark Cross (artist) (born 1955), a New Zealand artist
Mark Cross (footballer) (1956–2018), Australian rules footballer
Mark Cross (musician) (born 1965), British hard rock and heavy metal drummer
Mark Cross, pen name of author Archibald Thomas Pechey (1876–1961)
Mark Cross (brand), an American leather goods brand
Mark Cross, Rotherfield, a hamlet within the parish of Rotherfield, East Sussex

Cross, Mark